The Aix-Marseille-Provence Metropolis is the métropole, an intercommunal structure, centred on the cities of Marseille and Aix-en-Provence. It is located in the Bouches-du-Rhône, Var and Vaucluse departments, in the Provence-Alpes-Côte d'Azur region, southeastern France. It was created in January 2016, replacing the previous Communauté urbaine Marseille Provence Métropole and five communautés d'agglomération. Its area is 3149.2 km2. Its population was 1,889,666 in 2018, of which 868,277 in Marseille proper and 143,097 in Aix-en-Provence.

History 
The Aix-Marseille-Provence Metropolis was formed through the merger of the following communities:
 Urban Community of Marseille Provence Métropole
 Agglomeration Community of Pays d'Aix
 Agglopole Provence
 Ouest Provence
 Agglomeration Community of Pays d'Aubagne et de l'Étoile
 Agglomeration Community of Pays de Martigues

Communes 
Of the 92 communes of the métropole d'Aix-Marseille-Provence, 90 are part of the Bouches-du-Rhône department. Pertuis is in Vaucluse, and Saint-Zacharie is in Var.

Aix-en-Provence
Allauch
Alleins
Aubagne
Auriol
Aurons
La Barben
Beaurecueil
Belcodène
Berre-l'Étang
Bouc-Bel-Air
La Bouilladisse
Cabriès
Cadolive
Carnoux-en-Provence
Carry-le-Rouet
Cassis
Ceyreste
Charleval
Châteauneuf-le-Rouge
Châteauneuf-les-Martigues
La Ciotat
Cornillon-Confoux
Coudoux
Cuges-les-Pins
La Destrousse
Éguilles
Ensuès-la-Redonne
Eyguières
La Fare-les-Oliviers
Fos-sur-Mer
Fuveau
Gardanne
Gémenos
Gignac-la-Nerthe
Grans
Gréasque
Istres
Jouques
Lamanon
Lambesc
Lançon-Provence
Mallemort
Marignane
Marseille
Martigues
Meyrargues
Meyreuil
Mimet
Miramas
Pélissanne
Les Pennes-Mirabeau
La Penne-sur-Huveaune
Pertuis
Peynier
Peypin
Peyrolles-en-Provence
Plan-de-Cuques
Port-de-Bouc
Port-Saint-Louis-du-Rhône
Puyloubier
Le Puy-Sainte-Réparade
Rognac
Rognes
La Roque-d'Anthéron
Roquefort-la-Bédoule
Roquevaire
Rousset
Le Rove
Saint-Antonin-sur-Bayon
Saint-Cannat
Saint-Chamas
Saint-Estève-Janson
Saint-Marc-Jaumegarde
Saint-Mitre-les-Remparts
Saint-Paul-lès-Durance
Saint-Savournin
Saint-Victoret
Saint-Zacharie
Salon-de-Provence
Sausset-les-Pins
Sénas
Septèmes-les-Vallons
Simiane-Collongue
Le Tholonet
Trets
Vauvenargues
Velaux
Venelles
Ventabren
Vernègues
Vitrolles

References

Aix
Intercommunalities of Bouches-du-Rhône
Intercommunalities of Var
Intercommunalities of Vaucluse
Geography of Marseille